Hawke is a 2003 novel written by New York Times best-selling author Ted Bell. It is published by Atria Books.

Plot summary
A coup d'état involving rogue military leaders in Cuba leads to Alexander Hawke to investigate and stop the threat of a nuclear submarine.

External links
https://web.archive.org/web/20070707211319/http://www.tedbellbooks.com/hawke_plot.html

2003 American novels
American thriller novels
Novels set in Cuba
Atria Publishing Group books